Bernard Paulin Batillat (24 January 1908 – 4 September 1997) was a French rower. 

Batillat was born in 1908 in Coullons. He competed at the 1936 Summer Olympics in Berlin with the men's eight where they were eliminated in the semi-final. He died on 4 September 1997.

References

1908 births
1997 deaths
French male rowers
Olympic rowers of France
Rowers at the 1936 Summer Olympics
Sportspeople from Loiret
European Rowing Championships medalists
20th-century French people